The Miller-Bohannon JM-2 Special, named Pushy Galore, is a one-of-a-kind American homebuilt Formula One racing and record-setting aircraft. It was based upon Jim W Miller's Miller JM-2 design, highly modified by Bruce Bohannon.

Design and development
Bohannon began construction of Pushy Galore in 1988 and first flew it in the early part of 1989, first entering it in a race in June 1989.

The aircraft is of three-surface configuration, having a cantilever mid-wing, a single-seat enclosed cockpit under a bubble canopy, fixed main tricycle landing gear with a retractable nose wheel, a t-tail and a nose-mounted canard. It is powered by a single rear-mounted engine in pusher configuration.

The aircraft is made from welded steel tubing covered in molded carbon fiber. As required by the Formula One rules, its engine is a  Continental O-200A.

Only one example was ever built.

Operational history

In 1995 Bohannon flew the aircraft to second place in the Formula One Gold championship race at Reno, Nevada.

Bohannon also used the aircraft to set world time-to-climb records in the Fédération Aéronautique Internationale (FAI) C-1.A class.

After the climb records were set in 1996, Bohannon retired the aircraft and in 1998 donated it to the AirVenture Museum. Bohannon later went on to set many more time-to-climb records in his successor to Pushy Galore, the Bohannon B-1.

Aircraft on display
AirVenture Museum – The sole example built was donated to the museum in 1998.

Specifications (JM-2 Special Pushy Galore)

References

1980s United States sport aircraft
Single-engined pusher aircraft
Mid-wing aircraft
Homebuilt aircraft
Racing aircraft
Aircraft first flown in 1989